Argus (formerly known as Petroleum Argus Ltd) is an independent provider of price information, consultancy services, conferences, market data and business intelligence for the global petroleum, natural gas, electricity, emissions, biofuels, biomass, LPG, metals, chemicals, fertilizers, agriculture and coal industries.

Overview 
Argus is a privately held UK-registered company which produces price assessments and analysis of international energy and other commodity markets, and also offers consulting services and conferences.

Argus was the first price-reporting agency to apply an IOSCO audit for its energy benchmarks.

Argus was owned by the family of its founder Jan Nasmyth and its senior staff, but in September 2016 a majority-stake was sold to the equity firm General Atlantic valuing the company at $1.4 billion.

Argus's headquarters are in London, with major offices in Houston, Dubai, Singapore, Paris, Seoul, Amsterdam, Hamburg, Riga, Kyiv, Astana, Calgary, San Francisco, Mexico City, Washington DC, Pittsburgh, New York, Sao Paulo, Tokyo, Shanghai, Beijing, Mumbai, Sydney, Granada, Brussels, Lagos, and Cape Town. 

Prices assessed by Argus for energy, fertilizer, metals, petrochemicals and agriculture markets are widely used as benchmarks to settle futures contracts and as indexes for short or long term physical supply contracts.

History 
Argus was established in 1970 by former Daily Telegraph journalist Jan Nasmyth. In 1979, Argus became the first reporting agency to quote crude oil prices and published the first ever daily crude market wire.

In 2011, Argus bought FMB Consultants Ltd (FMB) - a price reporting agency for international fertilizer markets. FMB was founded in 1982 and focused on nitrogen, phosphate, sulphur, potash and ammonia.

In 2012, Argus also acquired US petrochemical market intelligence, pricing and consulting firm DeWitt & Co, and European power and gas fundamental data provider Fundalytics. In 2013, Argus bought petrochemical market specialists TABrewer Consulting and Jim Jordan & Associates.

Argus launched coverage of the global iron ore market with daily report Argus Steel Feedstocks in February 2013. Argus expanded its metals coverage further in 2015, after acquiring MetalPrices.com - a specialist pricing, news and analysis service focusing on speciality metals, rare earths and ferro-alloys.

In 2018, Argus purchased Integer Research a London-based market intelligence, conference and consulting firm.

In 2019, Argus acquired German oil reporting specialist O.M.R.

In 2020, Argus bought French agricultural intelligence company Agritel.

In 2021, Argus acquired the renewable chemicals specialist Oleochem Analytics.

In 2022, Argus acquired Pipe Logix, a US-based provider of pipe and tube market information.

Awards 
Argus won the Queen's Award for Enterprise: International Trade (Export) in the UK in 2002, 2009 and 2015.

References

External links 
 

Mass media companies based in London
Business services companies established in 1970
1970 establishments in England